Bishbriksha (English: The Poison Tree) is a Bengali novel written by Bankim Chandra Chatterjee. The novel was published serially in Bangadarshan. The novel deals with widow remarriage.

References

External links 
 Bishbriksha at NLTR 

Novels by Bankim Chandra Chattopadhyay
Works about widowhood
1873 novels